Azot is a historical and geographic region in North Macedonia located in the south-west of the city of Veles in the valley of Babuna mountain.

Geography of North Macedonia
Veles Municipality
Regions of North Macedonia